The Japanese occupation of Kiska took place between 6 June 1942 and 28 July 1943 during the Aleutian Islands Campaign of the American Theater and the Pacific Theater of World War II. The Japanese occupied Kiska and nearby Attu Island in order to protect the northern flank of the Japanese Empire. Along with the Attu landing the next day, it was the first time that the United States was occupied by a foreign power since the War of 1812, and was one of the two invasions of the United States during World War II.

Background
For the Imperial Navy, the North Pacific had a vast frontage from North-Kuril Islands to Minami-Tori-shima, and patrols in this vast sea area with few islands had not been easy. The Imperial Navy Fifth Fleet, which conducted patrols of the ocean off east of Japan, had begun to advocate since the end of January 1942 that the Imperial Navy occupy the western Aleutian Islands and advance the patrol line. In addition, the air raid on Minami-Tori-shima by the US Task Force in March 1942 raised concerns about the north Pacific Ocean throughout the Japanese military.

Although, it is not clear how the Navy General Staff requested the Combined Fleet Command to plan the Aleutian Operation (AL Operation) to occupy Attu and Kiska Islands, the Navy General Staff seemed to have acknowledged the necessity of AL Operation in response to the proposition of the Fifth Fleet when considering the Midway Operation.

Purpose of AL Operation
The plan of Imperial Navy's AL Operation was consulted with the Imperial General Headquarters Army Section on April 15. The plan was that "In early June, the Navy will attack Dutch Harbor and Adak Island, occupy Kiska Island and Attu Island. However, the Imperial Army was reluctant to occupy the Aleutian Islands and responded to the Navy on April 16 that the Army would not dispatch troops to the AL Operation.

However, the Doolittle raids on Japan from the north Pacific Ocean on April 18, 1942 had a great influence on the AL Operation. After the air raids on Japan by the Doolittle bombers, the Army also acknowledged the need to set up patrol bases on the western Aleutian Islands and agreed to dispatch troops on April 21.

The Navy General Staff promoted the Midway Operation and the AL Operation with the primary purpose of advancing the bases for patrol line, and the Combined Fleet Command also followed it. In other words, the purpose of the AL Operation is to build a patrol network in the North Pacific by establishing bases on the three islands of Midway, Attu, and Kiska to monitor attacks on Japan mainland by US Task Forces. At the same time, it was intended to prevent advances of US air bases.

Eventually, it was determined that the Imperial Army would invade Attu Island and the Imperial Navy (Navy Maizuru Third Special Naval Landing Force) would invade Kiska Island.  For the AL Operation, the Army established the North Sea Detachment (Hokkai-shitai) on May 5, headed by Major Matsutoshi Hozumi, consisted of approximately 1,000 men.

Details of the AL Operation
The order of operation was announced on May 5, 1942. The Great Naval Ordinance (Daikai-rei), Great Naval Instruction (Daikai-si), and Army and Navy Central Agreement on the AL Operation are as below.

The Great Naval Ordinance No. 18, May 5, 1942.
 Commanders-in-Chief of the Combined Fleet shall secure the western key points "AF" and "AO" with the Army.
 Details are instructed by the Chief of the Imperial Navy General Staff.
(Note: "AF" means Midway, and "AO" means Aleutian)

The Great Naval Instruction No. 94, May 5, 1942.
The operations under the Great Naval Ordinance No. 18 shall comply with the Army and Navy Central Agreement on Operation "AF" and the Army and Navy Central Agreement on Operation "AO".

The Army and Navy Central Agreement about the operation on Aleutian Islands.
1. Purpose of the operation
To secure or destroy key points in the western part of the Aleutian Islands, and to make enemy mobility and air power advance in this area difficult.
2. Policy of the operation
To invade Kiska and Attu Islands and destroy Adak's military facilities in corporate with Army and Navy.
3. Procedure of the operation
(1) The Army and Navy destroy Adak's military facilities in cooperation and then withdrew. Next, the Army troops invade Attu, and the Navy troops invade Kiska, and secure them until before winter.
(2) The Navy supports the invasion troops by the fleet with sufficient power. Before landing, the Navy raids Dutch Harbor area by the air units from the carriers in order to destroy the air force there.

"secure them until before winter" in the Procedure of the operation can be taken to mean withdrawing from Aleutian and not patrol in winter. However, it was guessed that the Navy would intend to remain in winter and continue patrols.

Occupation
Initially, the only American military presence on Kiska was a twelve-man United States Navy weather station—two of whom were not present during the invasion—and a dog named Explosion. The Japanese stormed the station, killing two Americans and capturing seven. After realizing that Chief petty officer William C. House had escaped, a search was launched by the occupying forces. The search ended in vain, with House surrendering some fifty days after the initial seizure of the weather station, having been unable to cope with the freezing conditions and starvation. After 50 days of eating only plants and worms, he weighed just 80 pounds. Beforehand, the prisoners of war had been sent to Japan.

The attack on Pearl Harbor and beginning of the Pacific Theater in World War II, coupled with Japanese threats to mainland Alaska along with the rest of the United States West Coast, had already made the construction of a defense access highway to Alaska a priority. On 6 February 1942, the construction of the Alaska Highway was approved by the U.S. Army and the project received the authorization from the U.S. Congress and President Franklin D. Roosevelt to proceed five days later.

Reacting to the Japanese occupation, American and Allied forces waged a continuous air bombardment campaign against the Japanese forces on Kiska. Also, U.S. Navy warships blockaded and periodically bombarded the island. Several Japanese warships, transport ships, and submarines attempting to travel to Kiska or Attu were sunk or damaged by the blockading forces.

Japanese evacuation and Allied casualties

In May 1943, U.S. forces landed on Attu in Operation Landcrab and subsequently destroyed the Japanese garrison there. In response, the Imperial Japanese Navy successfully evacuated the island of Kiska, ending the Japanese presence in the Aleutian Islands.

On July 29, 1943, Rear Admiral Kimura Masatomi, commanding two light cruisers and ten destroyers, slipped through the American blockade under the cover of fog and rescued 5,193 men. The operation was run by light cruisers Abukuma (1.212 men) and Kiso (1.189 men), and destroyers Yūgumo (479 men), Kazagumo (478 men), Usugumo (478 men), Asagumo (476 men), Akigumo (463 men) and Hibiki (418 men). The destroyers Hatsushimo, Naganami, Shimakaze and Samidare gave cover to the operation.

The successful evacuation of the garrison was subject of 1965 Seiji Maruyama's movie "Taiheiyô kiseki no sakusen: Kisuka" (literally, "Miracle Operation in the Pacific: Kiska").

Not completely sure that the Japanese were gone, the Americans and Canadians executed an unopposed landing on Kiska on 15 August, securing the island and ending the Aleutian Islands campaign. After the landing, the soldiers were greeted by a group of dogs who had been left behind. Among them was Explosion, who had been cared for by the Japanese.

Over 313 Allied casualties resulted from this attack on the unoccupied island, due to friendly fire, accidents, landmines, and booby traps.

Naval operations
On 19 June 1942, American aircraft attacked and sank the Japanese oiler Nissan Maru in Kiska Harbor and on 30 June American naval forces bombarded the island. Over 200 Japanese sailors were killed or wounded while the Americans sustained no losses, it became the single bloodiest engagement during the operations on and around Kiska.  was attacked by three Japanese submarine chasers while patrolling Kiska Harbor on 15 July. In response, she fired on and sank two of the Japanese ships and damaged the third. Grunion was lost a few weeks later off Kiska on 30 July with all hands, she is suspected of being sunk after one of her own torpedoes circled back when she attacked the Kano Maru.

On 8 August, the Japanese cargo ship Kano Maru was sunk at Kiska Harbor by PBY Catalinas. Days before, the cargo ship was damaged by one of Grunions torpedoes. Troopship Nozima Maru was also bombed and sunk in Kiska Harbor on 15 September. On 5 October, the Japanese steamer Borneo Maru was sunk at Gertrude Cove and on the 17th, the destroyer Oboro was sunk by American aircraft.  sank off Kiska on 4 November, Montreal Maru on 6 January 1943, and Uragio Maru on 4 April.  was grounded and abandoned by her crew on 23 June while assisting in removing Kiska's garrison.

See also
 Japanese Occupation Site, Kiska Island

References

Notes

Bibliography

External links

Logistics Problems on Attu by Robert E. Burks.
Aleutian Islands Chronology
Aleutian Islands War
Red White Black & Blue - feature documentary about The Battle of Attu in the Aleutians during World War II
PBS Independent Lens presentation of Red White Black & Blue  - The Making Of and other resources
Soldiers of the 184th Infantry, 7th ID in the Pacific, 1943-1945
3. Aleutian Operation (1) Attacks on Dutch Harbor "Battles around the Aleutian Islands from Japanese side views"

1942 in Alaska
1943 in Alaska
Aleutian Islands campaign
American Theater of World War II
Kiska
World War II occupied territories
Amphibious operations of World War II